Theodore Harden (1830 – 1900) was a member of the Queensland Legislative Assembly.

Harden won the seat of Mitchell in 1866. He resigned later in the year because he was elected against his knowledge and wishes. His brother Henry was a member of the Queensland Legislative Council.

References

Members of the Queensland Legislative Assembly
1830 births
1900 deaths
19th-century Australian politicians